WYNY (1450 AM) is an American radio station licensed to serve Milford, Pennsylvania.  The station is owned by Digital Radio Broadcasting, Inc.

It broadcasts an adult contemporary music radio format.

The station was assigned the call sign WYNY by the Federal Communications Commission (FCC) on August 22, 2011.

History
The station originally dates back to 2008 as WQCD. Its original airdate is 2011.

On July 5, 2012, WYNY changed their format from country music to adult contemporary.

On June 8, 2021, it was rebranded as "Lite 106.9".

Translators

References

External links

YNY
Mainstream adult contemporary radio stations in the United States
Radio stations established in 2011
Pike County, Pennsylvania